Ali İhsan Pasha (1882 – 9 December 1957) was the commander for the Sixth Army of the Ottoman Empire during World War I. After the war he was exiled to Malta by the British occupation forces. After returning to Turkey, he was appointed to the commandship of the First Army of Turkey. But shortly before the battle of Dumlupınar, he retired.

World War I

In February 1916, he was assigned as the commander of the Ottoman VIII Corps, which had a considerable role in the successful Siege of Kut. In 1918, his army was defeated by the British forces and he surrendered the remains of the 6th Army in October 1918 at the Battle of Sharqat, allowing the British to occupy Mosul in early November which was in violation to the Moudros Armistice signed between the British and Ottoman Empires a few days earlier. He also played a role in massacring the Armenians of northwestern Persia claiming that it was retaliation as the Armenians under General Andranik Ozanian had massacred the Muslim populations of Urmia, Salmas and Khoy.

Armenian genocide
Ali Ihsan is also known for his role in the Armenian genocide. While carrying his duties as commander of the 51st division, the Armenians that belonged to those units were murdered outright. When he took command of the 4th army, Ali Ihsan played a crucial role in the forceful exhaustion and starvation of Armenians, which accounted for the lives of tens and thousands. According to the German foreign ministry:
General A. Ihsan countless times and purposefully let the Germans know that he would not allow a single Armenian stay alive in his command zone. He bragged to German officers that "he had killed Armenians with his own hands" (rühmte sich mit eigener Hand Armenier getötet zu haben). - Profile at Google Books

Ali Ihsan Sabis was appointed the head of the 6th army and was tasked to enter Iran where he besieged the Armenian contingents in the area who were led by General Andranik Ozanian. He had also warned the local chieftains that they would be killed if Armenian refugees were hiding under their protection. Proceeding with massacring the local Armenian population, Ihsan confessed in front of a delegation of Armenians in Tabriz on 11 August:
I thank you for having come out to greet me, but listen to what I am going to tell you: above all, prove the truth of your words by your deeds. You are not unaware of all the afflictions that the Armenians of Urmia, Salmast, and Khoy have brought down upon the Muslim population. In retaliation, we killed the Armenians of Khoy and I gave the order to massacre the Armenians of Maku. If you with to be well treated, honor the promises that you have just made. If you do not, I cannot offer you any guarantees.

This speech was affirmed by the archives of the French foreign ministry which states:
Ali Ihsan Paşa, formerly the Commander of the Army Corps stationed at Van, entered Tabriz at the end of June 1918 in the capacity of Commander-in-Chief of the Ottoman Forces in Azerbaijan...In an address to an Armenian delegation he said approximately the following: "Let it be known that during my entry into Khoi I had the Armenians of the area massacred, without distinction of age and sex ..."

During a reception of the Armenian Prelate Mgr. Nerses, Ali Ihsan told him: "I had a half a million of your coreligionists massacred. I can offer you a cup of tea."

See also
List of high-ranking commanders of the Turkish War of Independence
List of Commanders of the First Army of Turkey

References

External links

1882 births
1957 deaths
Military personnel from Istanbul
Democrat Party (Turkey, 1946–1961) politicians
20th-century Turkish politicians
Deputies of Afyonkarahisar
Ottoman Army generals
Turkish Army generals
Ottoman military personnel of the Balkan Wars
Ottoman military personnel of World War I
Turkish military personnel of the Greco-Turkish War (1919–1922)
Commanders of the First Army of Turkey
Armenian genocide perpetrators
Malta exiles
Ottoman Imperial School of Military Engineering alumni
Ottoman Military College alumni
Burials at Zincirlikuyu Cemetery